Eldred may refer to:

Places

United States settlements
Eldred, Illinois
Eldred, Minnesota
Eldred, New York
Eldred, Pennsylvania
Eldred Township (disambiguation)

Geographical features
Eldred Glacier, King George Island east of Potts Peak, South Shetland Islands
Eldred Point, ice-covered point on the coast of Marie Byrd Land
Eldred Rock, island in the boroughs of Juneau and Haines, Alaska, United States
Eldred Rock Light, historic octagonal lighthouse adjacent to Lynn Canal in Alaska

People
Eldred (surname)
Eldred (given name)

Fictional characters
Eldred, the main character of the video game Sacrifice
Eldred Jonas, a character from the Stephen King novel Wizard and Glass
"Sir Eldred of the Bower, a Legendary Tale", a 17th century poem by Hannah More
Eldred the Saxon, a figure in GK Chesterton's The Ballad of the White Horse
Eldred Miller, bartender/saloon owner of The Silver Slipper on Little House on the Prairie

See also
 Eldred Theater, a theater building at Case Western Reserve University, Cleveland, Ohio